Lobaria hertelii is a species of foliose lichen in the family Peltigeraceae. Found in New Guinea, it was formally described as a new species in 2004 by Dutch lichenologist Harrie Sipman.

References

Peltigerales
Lichen species
Lichens described in 2004
Lichens of New Guinea
Taxa named by Harrie Sipman